Aboubacar Kobele Keita (born April 6, 2000) is an American professional soccer player who plays as a defender for Major League Soccer club Colorado Rapids.

Keita was born in New York City but grew up in Ohio, attending Westerville North High School and playing for the Crew SC Academy. After just one year in college at Virginia, he signed with Columbus Crew as the 12th Homegrown Player in club history. Keita made his professional debut in 2019 while on loan to Richmond Kickers in USL League One.

Early life
Although he was born in New York City, Keita was raised in Guinea, moved to Westerville, Ohio, at the age of 10 and attended Westerville North High School. As a sophomore, he was named Honorable Mention All-Ohio Capital Conference while primarily playing as a forward. He joined the Crew Academy in 2016, playing in the U.S. Soccer Development Academy for the U16/17 and U18/19 teams and scoring once in 43 appearances. Keita also trained with the Crew's first team and played against Charleston Battery at the 2018 Carolina Challenge Cup.

In January 2018, Keita took part in his first international camp, training with an assembled United States U19 national team in Lakewood Ranch, Florida. Later that month, he committed to play collegiately for coach George Gelnovatch at the University of Virginia.

College
Keita made his debut for Virginia on August 24, 2018, starting the season-opener against nationally ranked New Hampshire. He played the full 90 minutes in a 1–0 victory over the Wildcats. On September 28, he scored his first collegiate goal as part of a 2–0 victory against Pittsburgh. Keita appeared in all three postseason games for the Cavaliers, although they lost in the first round of the ACC Men's Soccer Tournament and were eliminated in the third round of the NCAA tournament. After concluding his lone collegiate season with one goal in 17 appearances, Keita was named to the Atlantic Coast Conference All-Freshman Team and earned an invite to a camp for the United States U20 national team.

Club career

Columbus Crew

2019: Professional signing, loan to Richmond, and return to Columbus 
On January 22, 2019, Keita was announced as the 12th Homegrown Player (HGP) signing in Columbus Crew history. He became the third HGP on the roster for Columbus' 2019 season, joining Wil Trapp and Alex Crognale. Keita had attended his first Crew game at the age of 12 and as a Crew Academy player had previously trained with the first team in prior years. 

In a bid to get acclimated to the professional game, Keita was sent on loan to USL League One club Richmond Kickers on March 6, 2019. The loan was for the duration of the 2019 USL League One season, with Columbus able to recall him at any point during the year. Although he began the season back in Columbus, recuperating from an injury suffered while on international duty, Keita made his professional debut on April 27. Against Chattanooga Red Wolves, he replaced Scott Thomsen in the 77th minute and helped Richmond see out a 1–0 victory.

After suffering an injury during the U20 World Cup, Keita returned to Columbus from his loan to Richmond. On July 3, he made his debut for Columbus with a midweek start against Real Salt Lake. Keita went on to make 10 appearances throughout the season for Columbus.

2020: Covid-19 pandemic and a shortened season 
Before COVID-19 pandemic derailed the initial start to the 2020 MLS season, Keita started and played 90 minutes in one of Columbus's two games. He started and played 90 minutes in a 1–1 draw with the Seattle Sounders. Keita went on to make a total of 13 appearances for Columbus during the Covid-shortened 2020 season, 12 appearances during the regular season and 1 appearance during the playoffs. Keita was part of the team that won MLS Cup 2020.

2021 
Keita made his debut for Columbus during the 2021 season by starting in the second leg of the CONCACAF Champions League game against Real Estelí; helping Columbus to a 1–0 win. He subsequently went on to start and play 90 minutes during the MLS regular season 0–0 draw against CF Montréal.

Colorado Rapids

2022: Trade to the Rapids and ACL tear 
On January 5, 2022, Keita was traded to Colorado Rapids in exchange for $300,000 in General Allocation Money, with Columbus potentially receiving an additional $150,000 should Keita reach certain performance marks. It was announced on March 10 that Keita had undergone successful ACL surgery on his right knee, which put him out the entirety of the 2022 MLS season.

International career

After earning previous camp call-ups for the United States U17, U18, and U19 national teams, Keita earned his first youth caps with the United States U20 team in March 2019. In the team's final camp ahead of the 2019 FIFA U-20 World Cup, he came off the bench against France on March 22 and provided Christian Cappis with a match-tying assist in second-half stoppage time; Keita also started three days later against Japan. On May 10, he was named to the final roster for the tournament by head coach Tab Ramos. Keita started all five games for the United States, playing every minute of the tournament until being subbed off in the 86th minute of the team's quarterfinal match against Ecuador. Throughout the tournament, he was noted to be sound defensively but struggled with distribution.

Career statistics

Honors
Columbus Crew
 MLS Cup: 2020
 Campeones Cup: 2021

Individual
 ACC All-Freshman Team: 2018

References

External links

 
 Virginia profile
 Columbus profile
 

2000 births
Living people
American people of Guinean descent
Sportspeople of Guinean descent
American soccer players
Soccer players from Columbus, Ohio
Soccer players from New York City
Association football defenders
Virginia Cavaliers men's soccer players
Columbus Crew players
Richmond Kickers players
Colorado Rapids players
USL League One players
Major League Soccer players
United States men's under-20 international soccer players
Homegrown Players (MLS)